This is a list of prime ministers of Iraq since 1920.

List of officeholders

See also
 List of kings of Iraq
 President of Iraq
 List of presidents of Iraq
 Vice President of Iraq
 Prime Minister of Iraq

References

Government of Iraq
 
Iraq, List of prime ministers of
Prime ministers